is a district located in Kyoto Prefecture, Japan.

As of 2003, the district has an estimated population of 16,519 and a density of 1,191.85 persons per km2. The total area is 13.86 km2.

Towns and villages
Kumiyama

Districts in Kyoto Prefecture